The 2011–12 Federal Hockey League season is the second season of the Federal Hockey League.

Teams

Playoffs

First round 
 (1) New Jersey Outlaws - (6) Cape Cod Bluefins 3:0  
 (2) Thousand Islands Privateers - (5) Akwesasne Warriors 2:1
 (3) Danbury Whalers - (4) Brooklyn Aviators 2:1

Second round 
 (1) New Jersey Outlaws received a bye to the finals.
 (3) Danbury Whalers - (2) Thousand Islands Privateers 2:0

Final 
 (1) New Jersey Outlaws - (3) Danbury Whalers 3:0

External links 
 Federal Hockey League website

FHL
Federal Prospects Hockey League seasons